Abida Sultana is a Bangladeshi adhunik singer.

Early life and career
Sultana was born to Abdus Salam and Muslima Begum. She completed her bachelor's in political science. She got her musical breakthrough in 1974. She performed as a playback singer for the films Abar Tora Manush Ho (1973), Alo Tumi Aleya and Yea Kore Biye. She was one of the  playback singers of the film Simana Periye (1977), composed by Bhupen Hazarika.

Sultana can render songs in 32 languages.

Sultana was awarded by Bangladesh Performing Media Centre (BPMC) in 2008.

Personal life
Sultana is married to the musician Rafiqul Alam since 14 April 1980. Their one son, Farshid Alam, is the main vocalist of the band Bohemian. She has four sisters, Rebeka Sultana, Rehena Sultana, Chitra Sultana and Salma Sultana, and two brothers, Shawkat Ali Emon and Mohammad Ali Shumon. Salma (d. 2016) was a singer.

Notable songs
 Tumi Cheyechile Ogo Jante
 Eki Badhone Bolo Jorale
 Ami Sath Sagor Pari Diye
 Bimurto Ei Ratri Amar
 Noyone Rekhe Noyon Kore
 Ekta Dolna Jadi
 Hiroyer Duri Achena Nadi 
 Harjit Chirodini Thakbe 
 Hate Thak Duti Haath
 Madhu Chandrimar Ai Raat 
 Rongila Pakhire 
 Ami Jotishir Kase Jabo

Bengali songs

Film songs

References

External links
 

Living people
20th-century Bangladeshi women singers
20th-century Bangladeshi singers
Bangladeshi playback singers
Year of birth missing (living people)
Place of birth missing (living people)
21st-century Bangladeshi women singers
21st-century Bangladeshi singers